Tascalate (alternative spelling Tazcalate) is a chocolate drink made from a mixture of roasted maize, chocolate, ground pine nuts, achiote, vanilla and sugar, very common in the Mexican state of Chiapas.
Ingredients do vary, so that some variants are dominated by the taste of roasted corn, whilst other mixtures are dominated by chocolate.
For preparing the hot drink, the ground ingredients are mixed with milk and heated. For a cold drink, ingredients are stirred in cold water and consumed with ice cubes.

References

Chocolate drinks
Mexican drinks